Wellington International Airport (formerly known as Rongotai Airport)  is an international airport located in the suburb of Rongotai in Wellington. It lies 3 NM or 5.5 km south-east from the city centre. It is a hub for Air New Zealand and Sounds Air. Wellington International Airport Limited, a joint venture between Infratil and the Wellington City Council, operates the airport. Wellington is the second busiest airport in New Zealand after Auckland, handling a total of 3,455,858 passengers in the year ending June 2022.
The airport, in addition to linking many New Zealand destinations with national and regional carriers, also has links to major cities in eastern Australia. It is the home of some smaller general aviation businesses, including the Wellington Aero Club, which operates from the general aviation area on the western side of the runway.

The airport comprises a small  site on the Rongotai isthmus, a stretch of low-lying land between Wellington proper and the Miramar Peninsula. It operates a single  runway with ILS in both directions. The airport handles turboprop, narrow-body and wide-body jet aircraft movements. The airport is bordered by residential and commercial areas to the east and west, and by Wellington Harbour and Cook Strait to the north and south respectively.

Wellington has a reputation for sometimes rough and turbulent landings, even in larger aircraft, due to the channelling effect of Cook Strait creating strong and gusty winds, especially in pre-frontal north-westerly conditions.

History 

Rongotai Airport opened with a tar runway in November 1929. The airport opened in 1935, but was closed down due to safety reasons on 27 September 1947 (grass surface often became unusable during winter months). During the closure, Paraparaumu Airport, 35 miles north of Wellington, was Wellington's airport, and became the country's busiest airport in 1949.

A proposal to relocate the terminal from the east side to the site of the Miramar Golf Course was put forward in 1956. Houses were moved and hills were bulldozed to make way for the construction of the new Wellington Airport in 1958, at a total cost of £5 million. The current airport was officially reopened on 25 October 1959, after lobbying by the local Chamber of Commerce for a location that was much closer to the city centre. Paraparaumu Airport was deemed unsuitable for large planes due to adverse terrain. Wellington's original domestic terminal was built as a temporary measure inside a corrugated iron hangar, originally used to assemble de Havilland aircraft. It was known for being overcrowded, leaky and draughty. This building remained visible from the Sounds Air terminal from which a covered walkway used to link the old terminal to the new one, but has since been removed. An upgrade of the domestic terminal, budgeted at NZ$10 million, was announced in 1981, but by 1983 the plans were shelved after cost projections more than doubled. The terminal was extensively refurbished in 1987 by Air New Zealand, and Ansett New Zealand built a new terminal as an extension to the international terminal when it commenced competing domestic air services in 1987.

In 1991, the airport released plans to widen the taxiway to CAA Code D & E specifications and acquire extra space, which were abandoned after protests from local residents. The plan involved the removal of the nearby Miramar Golf Course and a large number of residential and commercial properties. The Airport purchased land from the Miramar Golf Course in 1994 for car park space.

As recently as 1992, several alternate sites for Wellington Airport were considered – Te Horo, Paraparaumu, Mana Island, Ohariu Valley, Horokiwi, Wairarapa and Pencarrow – but a decision was made to upgrade the existing site at Rongotai. A major new terminal was completed in 1999 and integrated with the international terminal, which had been built as an abortive first stage of a whole new terminal in 1977. A 90 m safety zone at the south end of the runway was constructed in order to comply with ICAO safety regulations, while a similar zone has been put in place at the runway's north end.

Since 1998 the airport has been two-thirds privately owned by Infratil, with the remaining third owned by the Wellington City Council.

In late 2003 the airport installed a large statue of Gollum on the terminal in order to promote the world premiere of The Lord of the Rings: The Return of the King.

In April 2006, Air New Zealand and Qantas announced that they proposed to enter into a codeshare agreement, arguing that it would be necessary in order to reduce empty seats and financial losses on trans-Tasman routes. The airport counter-argued that the codeshare would stifle competition and passenger growth on Wellington's international flights, pointing to what it saw as a market duopoly dominated by Air New Zealand and Qantas. The codeshare was abandoned by the two airlines after it was rejected in a draft ruling by the Australian Competition & Consumer Commission in November 2006.

Fiji Airways began serving Wellington from Nadi on 25 June 2015. Jetstar launched its first international service in December 2014 from Wellington to the Gold Coast.

On 21 September 2016 Singapore Airlines began direct flights between Singapore and Wellington via Canberra. It was Wellington's first direct flight to a destination outside Australia and the Pacific Islands. From April 2018, the Singapore Airlines flight began transiting via Melbourne rather than Canberra.

Terminal

Overview 
Wellington Airport operates a single terminal at the east of the airport, with three piers: South, South-West and North-West. The main terminal building contains a common check-in area on the first floor and a common baggage claim area on the ground floor. Both connect to a retail area on the first floor, looking out onto the runway.

The gates in the South Pier (Gates 3 to 12), and the gates in the main terminal building (Gates 18 to 20) serve regional piston-engined and turboprop aircraft.  The gates in the South-West Pier (Gates 13 to 17) are predominantly used by Air New Zealand domestic jets, and with the exception of Gate 14, all are jetbridge gates.  The gates in the North-West Pier (Gates 21 to 29) are used by Jetstar domestic jets and all international flights: when transferred to international use, these gates are referred to as Gates 41 to 49 (e.g. Gate 26 is referred to as Gate 46 when used for an international flight).

Air New Zealand operates three lounges for Koru members: the Regional Lounge on the second floor of the main terminal for members travelling regionally on turboprop aircraft, the Domestic Lounge located after security screening in the South-West Pier for members travelling domestically on Air New Zealand jet aircraft, and the International Lounge located after outbound passport control in the North-West pier for members travelling internationally.  Qantas and Virgin Australia also operate lounges after outbound passport control in the North-West pier; these lounges are available to Qantas Club members and Velocity Frequent Flyers respectively departing on international flights.

Development 

The international terminal – partially built by the now-defunct Ansett New Zealand in 1986 – has been upgraded in various stages since 2005. On 19 February 2008, Wellington Airport announced the proposed design for a new, expanded international terminal. The design, nicknamed "The Rock" and penned by Studio Pacific Architecture and Warren and Mahoney, was a deliberate departure from traditional airport terminal design, and aroused a great deal of controversy. "The Rock" opened in October 2010. There have also been plans for expanding retail operations, as well as building a hotel and carpark.

Execujet (in conjunction with Capital Jet services) also operate a FBO and hangar facility for corporate jets and visiting general aviation aircraft on the Western apron. Other notable operators on the Western apron include Life Flight, the RNZAF and the Wellington aeroclub.

In April 2009, the airport issued a new master plan outlining upgrade plans over the next 20 years, including expanded terminal and apron space, and scope for runway extensions.

In 2013 the airport announced that it would be spending $40 million expanding its south west pier at the domestic terminal to cope with increased passengers numbers, with work expected to start in late 2013 and be finished by 2015. In 2014 it announced it would spend $250 million. The main building would be extended to the south by 35 metres at a cost of $62m and the north pier doubled in width for $19m. Extra levels would be added to the carpark and $30m spent in airfield works.

A NZ$1 billion 2040 Master Plan was announced in October 2019. It includes a terminal expansion, runway and taxiway improvements, new freight facilities, additional aircraft apron space and a new, relocated fire station.

Operations 
Wellington Airport has one runway: 16/34. The runway is grooved, which improves performance of the runway during wet conditions.

The airport has a night curfew from midnight to 6:00am, although international arrivals are allowed as late as 1:00am and there is a 30-minute grace period for delayed flights. In 2011, Qantas subsidary Jetconnect was fined $12,000 after a delayed flight from Sydney landed at 1:47am, seventeen minutes after curfew.

Air Movements Rongotai 
Air Movements Rongotai sits on the opposite side of the Wellington airport runway from the main passenger terminals, its main use being the facilitation of RNZAF flights and flights of overseas military forces. The current building was refurbished in the late 1980s when it housed not only the RNZAF Air movements unit but also 2 MCU (2nd Movements Control Unit) of the New Zealand Army. The role of 2 MCU was the logistic control and movement of defence personal and freight throughout New Zealand and abroad, utilising both civilian and military modes of transport.

Airlines and destinations

Statistics

Ongoing issues and development

Runway 
The length of the runway has limited the size of aircraft that can use the airport on a commercial basis, and non-stop overseas destinations are limited to the east coast of Australia and the South Pacific. Most large jet aircraft can safely use Wellington but the short runway severely limits their range to short-haul flights, and passenger numbers on trans-Tasman routes generally do not qualify the use of wide-body aircraft. Air New Zealand has occasionally used wide-body aircraft to cater for high-demand events such as major sports fixtures, and the airport has seen a number of wide-body movements over the years for heads of state and visiting foreign dignitaries, diversions or special promotional events. Singapore Airlines operate a Wellington-Melbourne-Singapore flight four times per week, using an Airbus A350-900.

A full-length runway extension to accommodate long-haul international flights has been previously investigated, but would require expensive land reclamation into Lyall Bay, and massive breakwater protection from Cook Strait. Doubts have existed over the viability of such an undertaking, particularly as Air New Zealand has repeatedly indicated that it has no interest in pursuing international service beyond Australia and the Pacific Islands, and few international airlines have shown serious interest in providing services beyond those points. Air New Zealand has questioned potential demand for such flights, citing the axing of its Christchurch-Los Angeles route in early 2006. Regional business organisations and the airport have put forward their case to various international airlines for long-haul operations to and from Wellington, pointing out that Christchurch's economy is mainly industrial and agricultural, while arguing that Wellington's economy is based mainly on what they see as the higher-value public service, financial, ICT, and creative sectors. In particular, a survey commissioned by the Wellington Chamber of Commerce found that respondents regarded the airport's limited international capacity as the biggest obstacle to the Wellington region's economic potential, by a long margin over other factors. It has also been pointed out that while Air New Zealand has been scaling back certain routes, it is adding others, most notably Auckland-Shanghai from 6 November 2006.

According to WIAL in 2009, the forthcoming Boeing 787 and Airbus A350 were originally predicted to have improved runway performance over existing long-haul aircraft, opening up the possibility of direct air links to Asia and the Americas if commercially viable. However, when the B787 was actually introduced into service, it was found that the "actual performance was not as favourable as was originally envisaged", prompting a decision to extend the north end of the runway. In 2011, the Wellington City Council, Mayor Celia Wade-Brown and local business leaders reiterated their support for lengthening the runway, as part of the Airport's 2030 Long Term Plan, however questions were raised about a possible conflict of interest regarding the then incumbent Mayors' role on Infratil's board of directors. The same year, Upper Hutt mayor Wayne Guppy called for further action on a runway extension, with a spokesman for the airport confirming a proposal to lengthen the southern end of the runway by 300 m at an estimated cost of $1 million a metre which could start early 2015. In 2013, United Arab Emirates-based airline Emirates said it would consider Wellington as a destination while the airport operator said 1000 people connect with long-haul flights to and from the capital each day. Also in 2013, China Southern Airlines expressed interest in starting a Guangzhou to Wellington service.

In late 2014, the Airport and the Wellington City Council jointly opened the Web site Connect Wellington to promote the case for a runway extension.

In January 2016, Singapore Airlines announced that it would begin services to Wellington via Canberra. The route, dubbed "The Capital Express", flew to Wellington via Canberra four times a week, using a Boeing 777-200 aircraft. The 777-200 was able to use Wellington Airport because the fuel needed to fly between Wellington and Canberra was relatively small; it could not take off from Wellington Airport if it carried the fuel required to fly non-stop to Singapore. The Deputy Mayor of Wellington argued Singapore Airlines' commitment to the capital helped the case for an airport runway extension, and showed that airlines are looking to fly to Wellington and that the extension would cater for that in the future. In 2018, the Capital Express route was redirected via Melbourne instead of Canberra. In 2019, Singapore Airlines announced that they will replace the 777-200 aircraft with the A350-900, starting 1 November 2019.

Boeing 747SP era 

Because of the runway limitations, Qantas introduced two short-bodied Boeing 747SPs on flights between Wellington and Australia in 1981. Air New Zealand operated DC-8s from Wellington on trans-Tasman routes, but when the planes were retired in 1981 none of its other planes were capable of operating international flights from Wellington – Air New Zealand's DC-10s required more runway length than Wellington had available, and twinjet planes such as the Boeing 737-200 were not yet ETOPS-certified.

The 747SP addressed this gap in the market, with Air New Zealand (after turning down an offer to purchase the type) code-sharing with Qantas. Special markings on the runway assisted Qantas pilots where to touch down and to abort and go round to attempt a landing again. The SP service to Wellington continued until 1985 when Qantas and later Air New Zealand took delivery of the more capable and economical Boeing 767-200ER type.

During this time Pan Am took an interest in the operation of 747SPs into the capital and proposed a possible long-range service to the US via Hawaii. However the New Zealand Government refused Pan Am's request for the route, citing Auckland Airport as the main gateway for overseas flights and the ability to generate passenger numbers amongst other things.

Access 
Wellington Airport's access is only by road. The airport lies at the southern end of the North Island section of State Highway 1, which connects the airport to Wellington City via the Mount Victoria Tunnel. SH 1 then continues to the Wellington Urban Motorway, which takes traffic out of the city and further afield to Porirua and the Kapiti Coast, and also onwards to the Hutt Valley and the Wairarapa via State Highway 2. Several taxi and shuttle companies serve the airport.

Metlink bus route 2 (between the CBD and Miramar/Seatoun) has a stop within walking distance of the terminal and connects to Metlink train services at Wellington railway station. The Metlink Airport Express bus service, which began on 1 July 2022, links the Wellington CBD directly with Wellington Airport.

Public transport to the airport is limited to buses as the Airport is quite distant from the Wellington railway station, making it difficult to link Wellington Airport to the CBD via a rail link. Feasibility studies, such as the Greater Wellington Regional Council's Ngauranga to Wellington Airport Corridor Plan, have been carried out to address this gap in the network, with light rail being touted as a solution by public transport advocates.

Incidents 

In spite of the short runway and frequent winds, there have been very few safety incidents at the airport. However:

 At the air show held on opening day in 1959 there were two significant incidents. A Royal New Zealand Air Force Sunderland flying boat scraped its keel along the runway during a low pass in turbulent conditions; it returned to its base at Hobsonville and was beached for repair. A Royal Air Force Avro Vulcan bomber aborted its landing when it touched down short of the runway, rupturing its left main landing gear drag link, the wing attachments and engine fuel lines; the aircraft flew to Ohakea air base where it was stranded for several months being repaired.
 On 17 February 1963, Vickers 807 Viscount, ZK-BWO, "City of Dunedin" of the National Airways Corporation overran the southern end of the runway ending up damaged down an embankment on the adjacent public road.
 On Tuesday 8 October 1991 a United Airlines Boeing 747-122 N4728U made an emergency landing after its intended destination, Auckland Airport, was closed by fog. It was estimated that if the plane had continued to its planned alternate destination, Christchurch, it would have had an unacceptable 15 minutes of fuel on board.

See also 
 List of airports in New Zealand
 List of airlines of New Zealand
 Transport in New Zealand
 List of busiest airports in New Zealand

References 

International airports in New Zealand

External links 

Official website
NZWN Details on AviationPage New Zealand
New Zealand AIP Operational Data Pages

Wellington City
Airports in New Zealand
Airports established in 1959
Transport in Wellington
1959 establishments in New Zealand
Transport buildings and structures in the Wellington Region